Thomas Phelps Ripley is a fictional character in a series of crime novels by American novelist Patricia Highsmith, as well as several film adaptations. He is a career criminal, con artist, and serial killer who always gets away with his crimes. The five novels in which he appears—The Talented Mr. Ripley, Ripley Under Ground, Ripley's Game, The Boy Who Followed Ripley, and Ripley Under Water—were published between 1955 and 1991.

In the novels
Highsmith introduced Tom Ripley in The Talented Mr. Ripley (1955) as a young man making a meager living as a con artist. The novel also supplies him with a backstory: orphaned at age five when his parents drowned, he was raised in Boston by his aunt Dottie, a cold, stingy woman who mocked him as a "sissy". As a teenager, he attempted unsuccessfully to run away from his aunt's home to New York City before finally moving there at age 20.

In The Talented Mr. Ripley, he is paid to go to Italy by Herbert Greenleaf, a shipbuilding magnate, to convince his son Dickie (a half-remembered acquaintance) to return to New York and join the family business. Ripley befriends the younger Greenleaf and falls in love with the rich young man's indulgent, carefree lifestyle; he also becomes obsessed with Greenleaf himself. He eventually murders Greenleaf after the playboy tires of him and spurns his friendship. He then assumes Greenleaf's identity, forging the signatures on his monthly remittances from a trust fund.

He rents an apartment in Italy and revels in the good life. He also assumes Greenleaf's style and mannerisms, imitating him so well that he essentially becomes him. However, the charade gets him in trouble whenever he is confronted by people who know both him and Greenleaf, particularly Greenleaf's suspicious friend, Freddie Miles, whom he eventually murders.

Ripley ultimately forges Greenleaf's will, leaving himself the dead man's inheritance. The novel ends with Ripley, having narrowly evaded capture, sailing to Greece and rejoicing in his newfound wealth. However, the book's final passages hint that he will pay for his freedom with a lifetime of paranoia, as he wonders whether he is "going to see policemen waiting for him on every pier that he ever approached".

In Ripley Under Ground (1970), set six years later, Ripley has settled down into a life of leisure in Belle Ombre, an estate on the outskirts of the fictional village of Villeperce-sur-Seine in France, which Highsmith locates "some forty miles south of Orly", "some twelve miles" from Fontainebleau, and "seven kilometres" from Moret.

Since coming into money, Ripley has added to his fortunes by marrying Héloïse Plisson, an heiress who has suspicions about how he makes his money, but prefers not to know. He avoids direct involvement in crime as much as possible in order to preserve his shady reputation, but he still finds himself involved in criminal enterprises, often aided by Reeves Minot, a small-time fence. Ripley's criminal exploits include a long-running art forgery scam (introduced in Ripley Under Ground and consistently mentioned in later books), an entanglement with the Mafia (in Ripley's Game), and several murders. In every novel, he comes perilously close to getting caught or killed, but ultimately escapes danger.

Characterization

Personality
Highsmith characterizes Ripley as a "suave, agreeable and utterly amoral" con artist and serial killer who always evades justice. Book magazine ranks Ripley at #60 on its list of the 100 Best Characters in Fiction since 1900.

Ripley is epicurean and sophisticated, living a life of leisure in rural France. He spends most of his time gardening, painting, or studying languages. This is financed by a stolen inheritance, a small income from the Buckmaster Gallery, and his wife's allowance from her wealthy father. He is polite, friendly, and cultured, and dislikes people who lack such qualities; when the Pritchards appear in Ripley Under Water, their poor taste and coarse manners immediately offend him.

Ripley has been critically acclaimed for being "both a likable character and a cold-blooded killer". Sam Jordison of The Guardian wrote, "It is near impossible, I would say, not to root for Tom Ripley. Not to like him. Not, on some level, to want him to win. Patricia Highsmith does a fine job of ensuring he wheedles his way into our sympathies."

In his review of Purple Noon, René Clément's 1960 adaptation of The Talented Mr. Ripley, film critic Roger Ebert described Ripley as "a committed hedonist, devoted to great comfort, understated taste, and civilized interests. He has wonderful relationships with women, who never fully understand who or what he is. He has friendships—real ones—with many of his victims. His crimes are like moves in a chess game; he understands that as much as he may like and respect his opponents, he must end with a 'checkmate'."

Sexuality
While Highsmith never explicitly portrays Ripley as gay or bisexual, certain passages in the Ripley novels imply that he harbors some unacknowledged attraction towards other men. In The Talented Mr. Ripley, he is obsessed with Dickie Greenleaf, and is jealous of Greenleaf's girlfriend Marge Sherwood to the point that he fantasizes about Greenleaf rejecting and hitting her. He is also afraid that others will think he is gay, and jokes that he wants to give up both men and women because he cannot decide which he likes more.

In Ripley Under Ground, he recalls "turning green" during his wedding, and going impotent with laughter while having sex with Heloise during their honeymoon. In The Boy Who Followed Ripley, he reflects that he and Heloise rarely have sex, and that frequent sexual demands on her part "really would have turned him off, maybe at once and permanently." The Boy Who Followed Ripley, meanwhile, has been cited as portraying a homoerotic subtext between Ripley and the novel's underage supporting protagonist, Frank Pierson. For example, Frank sleeps in Ripley's bed without changing the sheets, and speaks of his happiness at being at Belle Ombre with "the words of a lover".

Highsmith herself was ambivalent about the subject of Ripley's sexuality. "I don't think Ripley is gay," she said in a 1988 interview with Sight & Sound. "He appreciates good looks in other men, that's true. But he's married in later books. I'm not saying he's very strong in the sex department. But he makes it in bed with his wife."

Psychopathy
In his initial appearance, Ripley is portrayed as devoid of conscience, though he sometimes feels "regret" about his earliest murders—he considers the murder of Dickie Greenleaf "a youthful, dreadful mistake", and that of Freddie Miles "stupid" and "unnecessary"—he cannot remember the number of his victims. In his abovementioned review of Purple Noon, Roger Ebert wrote: "Ripley is a criminal of intelligence and cunning who gets away with murder. He's charming and literate, and a monster. It's insidious, the way Highsmith seduces us into identifying with him and sharing his selfishness; Ripley believes that getting his own way is worth whatever price anyone else might have to pay. We all have a little of that in us." In Ebert's review of the 1999 film The Talented Mr. Ripley, he describes Ripley as "a man who is irredeemably bad, and yet charming, intelligent and thoughtful about the price he pays for his amoral lifestyle... He's a monster, but we want him to get away with it." In his 2001 book Malignant Self-Love: Narcissism Revisited, Sam Vaknin writes that Ripley (as portrayed in the 1999 film) meets five of the seven criteria for antisocial personality disorder, and displays narcissistic traits.

In the later books, he is not without redeeming qualities, however: While in The Boy Who Followed Ripley, he admits that he has never been seriously troubled by guilt, he feels genuine affection (if not love) for several characters throughout the series, and has his own code of ethics; in Ripley's Game, Ripley reflects that he detests murder unless it is "absolutely necessary". He has typically been regarded as a "dapper sociopath" and an "agreeable and urbane psychopath".

Victims
Across the five books, Ripley commits homicide nine times, and indirectly causes an additional five deaths.

Adaptations
Highsmith's first three Ripley novels have been adapted into films. The Talented Mr. Ripley was filmed as Purple Noon (French: Plein Soleil) in 1960, starring Alain Delon as Ripley, and under its original title in 1999, starring Matt Damon. Ripley Under Ground was adapted into a 2005 film, starring Barry Pepper. Ripley's Game was filmed in 1977 as The American Friend, starring Dennis Hopper, and under its original title in 2002, starring John Malkovich.

The Ripley novels have also been adapted for television and radio. The Talented Mr. Ripley was adapted for a January 1956 episode of the anthology television series Studio One, and  Jonathan Kent played Ripley in a 1982 episode of The South Bank Show titled "Patricia Highsmith: A Gift for Murder", dramatizing segments of Ripley Under Ground. In 2009, BBC Radio 4 adapted all five Ripley novels with Ian Hart as Ripley.

Of the Ripley portrayals that Highsmith saw in her lifetime, she praised Delon's performance in Purple Noon as "excellent" and described Jonathan Kent as "perfect". She initially disliked Hopper's Ripley in The American Friend, but changed her mind after seeing the film a second time, feeling that he had captured the essence of the character.

In Joanna Murray Smith's 2014 play, Switzerland, Tom Ripley comes to life and visits Highsmith planning to kill her. In the 2014 Sydney Theatre Company premiere production, he was portrayed by Eamon Farren.

In 2015, The Hollywood Reporter announced that a group of production companies were planning a television series based on the novels. The following year, Deadline Hollywood announced that the series will be written by Neil Cross, having been in development at Endemol Shine Studios for over a year. In 2019, the show was ordered to series at Showtime, with actor Andrew Scott playing the lead role and writer-director Steven Zaillian replacing Cross.

Citations

General and cited sources 
 Schenkar, Joan. The Talented Miss Highsmith: The Secret Life and Serious Art of Patricia Highsmith. St. Martin's Press, 2009. .

Characters in American novels of the 20th century
Fictional bisexual males
Fictional characters from Boston
Fictional con artists
Fictional impostors
Fictional LGBT characters in film
Fictional LGBT characters in literature
Fictional career criminals
Fictional serial killers
Literary characters introduced in 1955
Male characters in film
Male characters in literature
Male film villains
Male literary villains
Fictional orphans
Orphan characters in literature
Orphan characters in film
Thriller film characters